The Molotov Plan was the system created by the Soviet Union in 1947 in order to provide aid to rebuild the countries in Eastern Europe that were politically and economically aligned to the Soviet Union (aka satellite state). It was originally called the "Brother Plan" in the Soviet Union and can be seen to be the Soviet Union's version of the Marshall Plan, which, for political reasons, the Eastern European countries would not be able to join without leaving the Soviet sphere of influence. Soviet foreign minister Vyacheslav Molotov rejected the Marshall Plan (1947), proposing instead the Molotov Plan—the Soviet-sponsored economic grouping which was eventually expanded to become the Comecon.

The Molotov Plan was symbolic of the Soviet Union's refusal to accept aid from the Marshall Plan, or allow any of their satellite states to do so because of their belief that the Marshall Plan was an attempt to weaken Soviet interest in their satellite states through the conditions imposed and by making beneficiary countries economically dependent on the United States (officially, one of the goals of the Marshall Plan was to prevent the spread of Communism). The plan was a system of bilateral trade agreements which also established Comecon to create an economic alliance of socialist countries. This aid allowed countries in Europe to stop relying on American aid and therefore allowed Molotov Plan states to reorganize their trade to the Soviet Union instead. The plan was in some ways contradictory because while the Soviets were giving aid to Eastern Bloc countries, at the same time they were demanding that countries who were members of the Axis powers (many of them Eastern Bloc countries themselves or a predecessor to an Eastern Bloc country) pay reparations to the Soviet Union.

List of nations which took part in the Molotov Plan 

 Soviet Union
 Poland
 Czechoslovakia
 Hungary
 Romania
 Bulgaria
 East Germany

See also 

 Invasion of Poland 1939
 Molotov-Ribbentrop pact
 Marshal plan

References 

Cold War history of the Soviet Union
Foreign relations of the Soviet Union
Comecon
Development in Europe
Economic development programs
Germany–Soviet Union relations
Czechoslovakia–Soviet Union relations
Romania–Soviet Union relations
Hungary–Soviet Union relations
Poland–Soviet Union relations
Bulgaria–Soviet Union relations
1947 in international relations
1947 in economics
Foreign trade of the Soviet Union
Soviet foreign aid
History of diplomacy